The following is a list of St Kilda Football Club leading goalkickers in each season of the Australian Football League (AFL) and AFL Women's.

AFL leading goalkickers

AFL Women's leading goalkickers

References 

 General

 
 

 Specific

Goalkickers
Australian Football League awards
Australian rules football-related lists